Immer die Radfahrer (Cyclists Forever) is a 1958 Austrian / West German comedy film directed by Hans Deppe.

Plot summary 
As students Fritz (Heinz Erhardt), Ulrich (Hans-Joachim Kulenkampff) and Johannes Wolf Albach-Retty went biking in Carinthia. Twenty-five years later they have made their ways. Fritz is a producer of alcoholic beverages, Ulrich is a stage actor and Johannes a teacher. When they look back at this biking tour the old friends are overcome by a feeling of nostalgia. They decide to take some time out together and relive the journey shared all those years ago. But things become complicated when Katinka, Fritz's future daughter-in-law,  confronts him because she's mad about his son Robby (played by Peter Kraus). She decides to hide from Robby by joining the three friends. Fritz and Johannes' wives and Ulrich's girl-friend hear rumours about their partners getting involved with women along the way. So they pick up their trail and follow them secretly. Indeed, the men run into their old flings, unaware of being watched...

Cast 
Heinz Erhardt as Fritz Eilers
Hans-Joachim Kulenkampff as Ulrich Salandt
Wolf Albach-Retty as professor Johannes Büttner
Waltraut Haas as Tilla Büttner
Mady Rahl as Malchen Eilers
Katharina Mayberg as "pussycat" Beryl
Corny Collins as Katinka
Christiane Hörbiger as Angelika Zander
Inge Meysel as Sylvia Koschinsky
Vera Balser-Eberle
Edith Elmay as Uschi
Eva Fichte
Traute Duscher as Lotte
Antonia Mittrowsky as Marianne Hopfleder
Erna Schickl as Grete Köck
Günther Bauer as tenor Bert Erichsen
Walter Janssen as theatre manager Popp
Peter Kraus as Robby Eilers

Soundtrack 
Polydor - "Mit Siebzehn" (Music: Werner Scharfenberger, lyrics: Fini Busch)

External links 

1958 films
1958 comedy films
Austrian comedy films
German comedy films
West German films
1950s German-language films
Films scored by Hans Lang
1950s German films